Cephaloxys can refer to:
Cephaloxys  Smith, F., 1865, ant, synonym of Strumigenys
Cephaloxys Desv., illegitimate superfluous name, plant, synonym of Juncus